The 112th Fighter Escadrille of the Polish Air Force (Polish: 112. Eskadra Myśliwska) was one of the fighter units of the Polish Army.

History

The Escadrille was created in 1919 by a merger of the earlier 18th Reconnaissance Escadrille and the 19th Fighter Escadrille.

In September 1939 the 112th Fighter Escadrille was incorporated into the Pursuit Brigade.

Crew and equipment

On 1 September 1939 the escadrille had 10 planes: 6 PZL P.11c and 4 PZL P.11a.

The air crew consisted of: 
commanding officer captain Tadeusz Opulski, 
his deputy Lieutenant Stefan Stanisław Okrzeja, 
and 15 other pilots:

por. Wacław Łapkowski
ppor. Jan Daszewski
ppor. Witold Łokuciewski
ppor. Wiktor Strzembosz
pchor. Janusz Marciniak
pchor. Władysław Nowakowski
pchor. Antoni Polek
plut. Karol Krawczyński
plut. Ludwik Lech
kpr. Bernard Ryszard Górecki
kpr. Jan Musiał
st. szer. Paweł Gallus
st. szer. Leon Nowak
st. szer. Zygmunt Rozworski
st. szer. Władysław Wieraszka

See also

Polish Air Force order of battle in 1939

References

Polish Air Force escadrilles